Roessleville is a hamlet in the town of Colonie, Albany County, New York, United States. It is a densely settled suburb of the city of Albany, along New York State Route 5. Roessleville was a census-designated place in the 1990 Census, but was deleted in 2000, but became a CDP again in 2020.

History
Roessleville was originally of the Pine Bush pine barrens that stretched from Albany to Schenectady; the land later became farmland in the 1940s, then more recently transformed into a densely packed suburb. Roessleville is named for Theophilus Roessle, a German immigrant from the Kingdom of Württemberg, who built one of the most elegant mansions in the Albany area in what is now Roessleville; today's Elmhurst Avenue was once his gated driveway. Two of the most famous residents of Roessleville was Josiah and Elizabeth Stanford; parents of Governor of California Leland Stanford; who moved the entire family here in 1840 and owned the Elm Grove Farm and hotel.

Geography
Roessleville is that section of the town of Colonie between Osborne and Wolf roads, it is bisected by Central Avenue (NY Route 5). The Albany city line is along its southeastern border, the village of Colonie is along its northwestern boundary at Wolf Road.

Location

Demographics

Since hamlets are by definition ill-defined any attempt at accurate calculations of population related statistics will be difficult or inaccurate. As a census-designated place (CDP) prior to 2000 however Roessleville did have definitive boundaries, though they did change over time from one census to another. Roessleville was not a CDP in 1960, but was in 1970 when it had 5,476 persons which included 125 in a small slice of the town of Guilderland; the Guilderland section was not included in 1980, and in 1990 Roessleville had a population of 10,753.

References

Colonie, New York
Hamlets in New York (state)
Former census-designated places in New York (state)
Hamlets in Albany County, New York